The 2016–17 Bucknell Bison women's basketball team represented Bucknell University during the 2016–17 NCAA Division I women's basketball season. The Bison, led by sixth year head coach Aaron Roussell, played their home games at Sojka Pavilion and were members of the Patriot League. They finished the season 27–6, 16–2 in Patriot League play win Patriot League regular season title. They won the Patriot League women's tournament to earn an automatic trip to the NCAA women's tournament for the first time since 2008, where they lost to Maryland in the first round.

Roster

Schedule

|-
!colspan=9 style="background:#FF5E17; color:#0041C4;"| Non-conference regular season

|-
!colspan=9 style="background:#FF5E17; color:#0041C4;"| Patriot League regular season

|-
!colspan=9 style="background:#FF5E17; color:#0041C4;"| Patriot League Women's Tournament

|-
!colspan=9 style="background:#FF5E17; color:#0041C4;"| NCAA Women's Tournament

See also
 2016–17 Bucknell Bison men's basketball team

References

Bucknell
Bucknell Bison women's basketball seasons
Bucknell
Bucknell
Bucknell